Franklin Lawson is a retired American soccer player who played professionally in the American Soccer League and the United Soccer League.

Raised in Old Bridge Township, New Jersey, Lawson graduated from Cedar Ridge High School. He then attended Belmont Abbey College where he graduated in 1977.

He turned professional in 1981 with the Nashville Diamonds of the American Soccer League. He played for the Pennsylvania Stoners and Charlotte Gold in 1984. He spent time with the New York Arrows of the Major Indoor Soccer League. He played for the New York Nationals in the United Soccer League.  He finished his professional career with the Atlanta Lightning of the SISL. He later played for Atlanta Datagraphic.  He served as an assistant with the Georgia Perimeter College women's soccer team from the 1990s until recently. He coached for the OFC Black team and led them to a five-win season and a semifinal appearance in the Athens Finale in 2014. The team finished on the brink of promotion with 27 points. He is currently a coach of the 06 boys team of the CSC youth soccer club in Anchorage, Alaska.

References

External links

Belmont Abbey College alumni
American soccer coaches
American soccer players
American Soccer League (1933–1983) players
Atlanta Datagraphic players
Atlanta Lightning players
Nashville Diamonds players
Pennsylvania Stoners players
Charlotte Gold players
New York Arrows players
Fort Lauderdale Sun players
New York Nationals (USL) players
USISL players
United Soccer League (1984–85) players
Living people
People from Old Bridge Township, New Jersey
Sportspeople from Middlesex County, New Jersey
Soccer players from New Jersey
Association football forwards
Year of birth missing (living people)